The Institut d'astrophysique spatiale (IAS; English: Institute of Space Astrophysics) is a French research institute supporting advanced research in aerospace and astrophysics. It is located in Orsay, just south of Paris. It is a public research institute in a partnership with the University of Paris-Saclay.

Famous Researchers
 Pierre Cox, a French astronomer
 Jean-Loup Puget, a French astrophysicist

References

External link 
 Official website 

Research institutes in France
Buildings and structures in Essonne
Education in Île-de-France